The 2020 CarShield 200 presented by CK Power was the 14th stock car race of the 2020 NASCAR Gander RV & Outdoors Truck Series season, and the 20th iteration of the event. The race was held on Sunday, August 30, 2020 in Madison, Illinois at World Wide Technology Raceway, a  permanent oval-shaped racetrack. The race took the scheduled 160 laps to complete. At race's end, Sheldon Creed of GMS Racing would pass the dominating Todd Gilliland late in the race to win the race, the third of his career and the season. To fill the rest of the podium, Brett Moffitt of GMS Racing and Austin Hill of Hattori Racing Enterprises finished 2nd and 3rd, respectively.

Background 
Known as Gateway Motorsports Park until its renaming in April 2019, World Wide Technology Raceway is a 1.25-mile (2.01 km) paved oval motor racing track in Madison, Illinois, United States. The track previously held Truck races from 1998 to 2010, and returned starting in 2014.

Entry list

Starting lineup 
The starting lineup was based on a metric qualifying system based on the results and fastest laps of the previous race, the 2020 KDI Office Technology 200 and owner's points. As a result, Zane Smith of GMS Racing won the pole.

Race results 
Stage 1 Laps: 55

Stage 2 Laps: 55

Stage 3 Laps: 50

References 

2020 NASCAR Gander RV & Outdoors Truck Series
NASCAR races at Gateway Motorsports Park
August 2020 sports events in the United States
2020 in sports in Illinois